Sacred Heart Academy may refer to various institutions:

in the United States:

Sacred Heart Academy (Redlands, California)
Sacred Heart Academy (Hamden, Connecticut)
Sacred Heart Academy (Stamford, Connecticut)
Sacred Heart Academy (Louisville), Louisville, Kentucky
Sacred Heart Academy (New York), Hempstead, New York
Sacred Heart Academy (Cincinnati, Ohio)
Sacred Heart Academy High School (Mt. Pleasant, Michigan)
Sacred Heart Academy Bryn Mawr, Pennsylvania
Sacred Hearts Academy, Hawai'i
Academy of the Sacred Heart, Grand Coteau, Louisiana
Academy of the Sacred Heart (New Orleans, Louisiana)
Academy of the Sacred Heart, Bloomfield Hills, Michigan
Woodlands Academy of the Sacred Heart, Lake Forest, Illinois
Buffalo Academy of the Sacred Heart, Amherst, New York
Flintridge Sacred Heart Academy, La Canada, California
Elsewhere:
 Sacred Heart Academy of Santa Maria Bulacan, Santa Maria, Bulacan, Philippines

See also 
 Sacred Heart school (disambiguation)
 Sacred Heart Seminary (disambiguation)
 Sacred Heart (disambiguation)